This article is part of the history of rail transport by country series

The history of rail transport in Equatorial Guinea began in 1913, when a standard-gauge railway was constructed from the capital of Equatorial Guinea, Santa Isabel, to the nearby villages of Banapa and Basupo.  In 1929 this railway was extended to the shore near Basupo but the line was unprofitable and was then closed.

There is currently no rail transport in Equatorial Guinea.

See also

History of Equatorial Guinea
Transport in Equatorial Guinea

References